Ivan Hudec (10 July 1947 – 7 February 2022) was a Slovak writer and politician. A member of the People's Party – Movement for a Democratic Slovakia, he served as Minister of Culture from 1994 to 1998. 

Hudec died in Bratislava on 7 February 2022, at the age of 74.

References

1947 births
2022 deaths
20th-century Slovak politicians
Party of the Democratic Left (Slovakia) politicians
People's Party – Movement for a Democratic Slovakia politicians
Culture ministers of Slovakia
Comenius University alumni
Slovak writers
Members of the National Council (Slovakia) 1992-1994
Members of the National Council (Slovakia) 1998-2002
Politicians from Nitra